Kishan Lal Passi (February 2, 1917 – January 22, 2004) served as treasurer and secretary of the Mumbai Hockey Association for 25 years. He was also vice-president of Maharashtra Olympic Association. He also served the Indian Hockey Federation as secretary general for nine years.

2004 deaths
1917 births